The Brabant Ensemble is an early music choir based in Oxford, directed by Stephen Rice.

Discography
Clemens non Papa: Missa "Ecce quam bonum" Behold How Joyful 
Antoine Brumel: Missa de Beata Virgine,  
Palestrina: Missa Ad coenam Agni 
Jean Mouton: Missa Tu es Petrus,  
Cipriano de Rore: Missa Doulce memoire,  
Pierre de Manchicourt: Missa Cuidez vous que Dieu nous faille, 
Clemens non Papa: Missa pro defunctis (Requiem) 
Orlando di Lasso: Prophetiae Sibyllarum Missa Amor ecco colei, 
Cristobal de Morales: Magnificat  
Dominique Phinot: Missa Si bona suscepimus,  
Pierre Moulu: Missa Missus est Gabriel angelus, 
Nicolas Gombert: Motets Tribulatio et angustia 
Music from the Chirk Castle Part-Books
Thomas Crecquillon: Missa Mort m'a prive,
Jacquet of Mantua: Missa Surge Petre & Motets
Pierre de la Rue: Missa Nuncqua fue pena mayor

References

Early music groups